Glucose-6-phosphatase 3, also known as glucose-6-phosphatase beta, is an enzyme that in humans is encoded by the G6PC3 gene.

Function 

This gene encodes the catalytic subunit of glucose 6-phosphatase (G6Pase). G6Pase is located in the endoplasmic reticulum (ER) and catalyzes the hydrolysis of glucose 6-phosphate to glucose and phosphate in the last step of the gluconeogenic and glycogenolytic pathways.

Clinical significance 

Mutations in this gene result in autosomal recessive severe congenital neutropenia.

G6PC3 deficiency results in a phenotypic continuum. At one end the affected individuals have only neutropenia and related complications but no other organ is affected. This is sometimes referred to as non-syndromic or  isolated severe congenital neutropenia. Most affected individuals have a classic form of the disease with severe congenital neutropenia and cardiovascular and/or urogenital abnormalities. Some individuals have severe G6PC3 deficiency (also known as Dursun syndrome) and they have all the features of classic G6PC3 deficiency but in addition show involvement of non-myeloid hematopoietic cell lines, some other extra-hematologic features and pulmonary hypertension.

References

Further reading 

 
 

EC 3.1.3